The name of the city of Pittsburgh, Pennsylvania, has a complicated history. Pittsburgh is one of the few U.S. cities or towns to be spelled with an h at the end
of a burg suffix, although the spelling Pittsburg was acceptable for many years and was even held as standard by the federal government (but not the city government) from 1891 to 1911.

Etymology 

Pittsburgh was named in honor of William Pitt, 1st Earl of Chatham, often referred to as William Pitt the Elder to distinguish him from his son William Pitt the Younger.

The suffix burgh is the Scots language and Scottish English cognate of the English language borough, which has other cognates in words and place names in several Indo-European languages. Historically, this morpheme was used in place names to describe a location as being defensible, such as a hill, a fort, or a fortified settlement.

History and spellings 

Pittsburgh was so named when British forces captured Fort Duquesne during the French and Indian War (Seven Years War). The earliest known references to the new name of the settlement are in letters sent by General John Forbes, dated 26 and 27 November 1758, reporting the capture of the fort. In copies of and quotes from those letters in later sources, the name of Pittsburgh is spelled with and without the h, and sometimes with an o before the u. As a Scotsman, General Forbes probably pronounced the name  , similar to the pronunciation of "Edinburgh" as a Scotsman would say it:  . The name appeared in print at least as early as 14 December 1758, when the Pennsylvania Gazette published a letter written by a member of Forbes's army from "Pittsburgh (formerly Fort Duquesne)".

For a long time, there was little regard for uniformity in the spelling of Pittsburgh's name. Early municipal documents and city directories generally spelled the name with a final h, but the letter is notably omitted in the city charter enacted by the state legislature in 1816. The variance in spelling persisted through the 19th century. In 1890, some local newspapers were using the final h and some were not.

The name of the city was normally spelled without an h in German (including Pennsylvania Dutch), in which geographical names ending in -burg and -berg (and never followed by an h) are very common.

Federal board decisions

In 1890, the United States Board on Geographic Names was created to establish uniform place name usage throughout the various departments and agencies of the U.S. government. To guide its standardization efforts, the Board adopted thirteen general principles, one of which was that the final  should be dropped from place names ending in -burgh. The Board compiled a report of place name "decisions" in 1891 in which Pittsburgh's name for federal government purposes was rendered Pittsburg.

In support of its decision favoring the Pittsburg spelling, the Board referenced the 1816 city charter. The full decision and rationale from the Board follows:
Pittsburg. Pennsylvania.The city was chartered in 1816, its name being spelled without the h, and its official form is still Pittsburg. The h appears to have been added by the Post-Office Department, and through that action local usage appears to have become divided. While the majority of local newspapers print it without the h, certain others use the final h.

The Board's decisions were compulsory upon all federal government agencies, including the Post Office. Outside the federal government, the decisions, while highly influential, were not officially binding. The Pittsburgh city government continued to use the spelling with the h, as did such local institutions as the Pittsburgh Gazette, the Pittsburgh Stock Exchange and the University of Pittsburgh. In 1908, a Pittsburgh Chamber of Commerce committee, after conducting a review of historical documents, endorsed Pittsburgh as the proper way to spell the city's name and looked toward getting that spelling federally recognized. Responding to mounting pressure and, in the end, political pressure from senator George T. Oliver, the names board reversed itself and added an h to its spelling of the city on July 19, 1911. The letter sent to Senator Oliver to announce this decision, dated July 20, stated:

Hon. George T. Oliver, United States Senate:

Sir: At a special meeting of the United States Geographic Board held on July 19, 1911, the previous decision with regard to the spelling of Pittsburgh without a final H was reconsidered and the form given below was adopted:

Pittsburgh, a city in Pennsylvania (not Pittsburg).

Very respectfully,
C. S. SLOAN,
Secretary.

With the spelling controversy largely settled, the h-less form of the city's name headed toward extinction. There were some holdouts: the city's largest-circulation newspaper, The Pittsburg Press, adhered to the shorter spelling until 1921; The Pittsburg Dispatch and The Pittsburg Leader did so until ceasing publication in 1923.

Many cities across the United States named after the city of Pittsburgh, such as Pittsburg, Kansas, Pittsburg, California, and West Pittsburg, Pennsylvania, continue to use the Pittsburg spelling in their names. Other independent municipalities, such as the borough of East Pittsburgh, Pennsylvania, reflect the modern spelling.

Baseball card 

Perhaps the most familiar reference to the Pittsburg spelling is on the renowned 1909 T-206 baseball card of Pittsburgh Pirates legend Honus Wagner. Its scarcity, even at the time, combined with Wagner's reputation as one of the greatest players in baseball history, made it the most valuable sports card of all time, with one pristine specimen yielding $6.6 million at auction. It has been characterized as the "Holy Grail" of baseball cards. The city name displayed across Wagner's jersey on the card was an artistic addition that did not actually appear on the Pirates' uniforms of the time. The portrait of Wagner makes it appear as if there could be an H on the end, cut off by the border of the picture, but this notion is countered by the appearance of "PITTSBURG" in the underlying caption and on other Pirate portraits from the T-206 card set.

The -h in Pittsburgh culture 
The presence of the -h at the end of the word Pittsburgh is occasionally recognized in Pittsburgh culture.  It is often rendered as PGH. For example, Pittsburgh International Airport's abbreviation is PIT, while Union Station's abbreviation is PGH. The area's Fox affiliate takes their calls, WPGH-TV from this. A recent playful take on the final -h of Pittsburgh appears in the name of the Pittsburgh Water and Sewer Authority's brand of bottled water: PGH2O, which is a portmanteau of the abbreviation PGH and the chemical name for water, H2O. "Da 'Burgh" or "Da Burgh" is a local and affectionate nickname for the city.  In homage to the city's history, the "Pittsburg Plunge" at Kennywood park retains the alternate spelling without the h.

See also
Alburgh, Vermont, a town whose name was changed from Alburgh to Alburg in the 19th century, apparently by influence of the same 1891 decision that applied to the spelling of Pittsburgh. The Alburgh spelling was restored in 2006.
Newburgh, New York, another early U.S. city with a trailing h.
Plattsburgh, New York, another early U.S. city with a trailing h, located in the northeastern corner of the state.

Notes

References

External links
Google Books Ngram Viewer graph showing relative usage of "Pittsburgh" vs. "Pittsburg" in a corpus of English-language books over time.

History of Pittsburgh
Pittsburgh, Etymology of
Major League Baseball controversies